Wasfi Tal (also known as Wasfi Tell; 19 January 1919 – 28 November 1971) was a Jordanian politician, statesman and general. He served as the 15th Prime Minister of Jordan for three separate terms, 1962–63, 1965–67 and 1970 until his assassination in 1971.

Tal was born in Turkey to prominent Jordanian poet Mustafa Wahbi Tal. He moved to Jordan at 5 years old. He received his education in Al-Salt, later continuing his education at the American University of Beirut in 1941. He then joined the British Army in Mandatory Palestine after being trained in a British-run military academy, and joined the irregular Arab Liberation Army to fight against Israel during the 1948 Arab–Israeli War.

Following the war, he served various positions in the Jordanian government, rising to higher positions after his abilities captured King Hussein's attention. His first tenure as prime minister in 1962 was short-lived, he resigned in 1963 over widespread criticism of his perceived pro-Western views. He was appointed prime minister again in 1965, which saw an improved climate of economic activity, but resigned just before the onset of the Six Day War in 1967. He was appointed again as prime minister in 1970 during Black September, the conflict which saw Palestine Liberation Organization fighters (fedayeen) expelled from Jordan. Earning the ire of PLO leaders for his role in the conflict, he was assassinated by the Black September group outside a Cairo hotel hosting an Arab League conference.

Tal was reportedly loyal to King Hussein and popular with Jordanians for his success in expelling the fedayeen. Meanwhile, he was widely denounced by Arabs who had supported the fedayeen. His assassins were found innocent and released on bail by an Egyptian court.

Early life and career

Tal was born in Arapgir to prominent poet Mustafa Wahbi Tal and Kurdish mother Munifa Baban. His family relocated to Irbid when he was five. He moved to Al-Salt in 1936 when he was 16 to go to the only public high school in Jordan at the time. As a student he founded a secret student organization called the "Black Hand" whose goal was to promote a more aggressive stance against Zionism. During his time as a student he and several students in the "black hand" were arrested after bombing Al-Salt mayor's mansion. Due to his family influence and the fact no one was hurt in the bombing he was released a few days later and allowed to finish his education. Later continuing his education at the American University of Beirut in 1941.

He then joined the British Army in Mandatory Palestine after being trained in a British-run military academy, and joined the irregular Arab Liberation Army to fight against Israel during the 1948 Arab–Israeli War. Due to his experience in the British army he started off with the rank of captain. After the Arab Liberation Army was dissolved in 1948 his unit was reassigned to the Syrian army for the remainder of the war under the new name Yarmuk Forces. By May 1949 he had risen to the rank of major.

Following the war, he served various positions in the Jordanian government, rising to higher positions after his abilities captured King Hussein's attention. His first tenure as prime minister in 1962 was short-lived, he resigned in 1963 over widespread criticism of his perceived pro-Western views. He was appointed prime minister again in 1965, which saw an improved climate of economic activity, but resigned just before the onset of the Six Day War in 1967. He was appointed again as prime minister in 1970 during Black September, the conflict which saw Palestine Liberation Organization fighters (fedayeen) expelled from Jordan. Earning the ire of PLO leaders for his role in the conflict, he was assassinated by the Black September group outside a Cairo hotel hosting an Arab League conference.

Assassination

On 28 November 1971, four Black September gunmen assassinated Tal in the lobby of the Sheraton Cairo Hotel in Egypt while he was attending an Arab League summit in the city. Historian Patrick Seale claims that one of the assassins, Munshir al-Khalifa, was one of Abu Ali Iyad's soldiers who sought to avenge his commander's death. As Tal lay dying, "one of the assassins knelt and lapped with his tongue the blood flowing across the marble floor."

Tal was the first victim of the newly formed Black September Organization, a more militant offshoot of the Palestinian militant organization Fatah. His assassins were released on low bail and allowed to leave Egypt. Yasser Arafat, Fatah's leader, claimed responsibility for the killing.

Tal was popular with Jordanians for his success in expelling the fedayeen. Meanwhile, he was widely denounced by Arabs who had supported the fedayeen. Egyptian President Anwar Sadat had also despised Tal. Tal was the third senior Jordanian political figure assassinated between 1951 and 1971; the first two being King Abdullah I and Prime Minister Hazza Majali. His assassins were found innocent and released on bail by an Egyptian court.

Tal's body was flown back to Amman on 28 November 1971. He was buried in the royal cemetery after the prayers in the Royal Mosque in Amman on 29 November.

Personal life
Tal was married to Sadia Jabri, who had been former wife of the Palestinian leader of the 1940s, Musa Alami. They had no children.

Honour

Foreign honour
 : 
 Honorary Grand Commander of the Order of the Defender of the Realm (SMN (K)) – Tun (1965)

See also
 List of prime ministers of Jordan
 Palestinian political violence
 Mustafa Wahbi Tal
 Abdullah Tal

References

Bibliography

 
 
 

Honorary Grand Commanders of the Order of the Defender of the Realm 
1919 births
1971 deaths
People from Irbid
Assassinated heads of government
Assassinated Jordanian politicians
Deaths by firearm in Egypt
Agriculture ministers of Jordan
Government ministers of Jordan
Defence ministers of Jordan
Jordanian people murdered abroad
People murdered in Egypt
Prime Ministers of Jordan
Victims of the Black September Organization
American University of Beirut alumni
Jordanian military personnel
Jordanian diplomats
Ambassadors of Jordan to Iraq
Members of the Senate of Jordan
Jordanian people of the 1948 Arab–Israeli War
British Army personnel of World War II
1971 murders in Asia